Faculta synthetica is a moth of the family Gelechiidae. It is found in Mexico (Sonora).

The wingspan is 11–12 mm. The forewings are blackish with a slight purplish tinge and minute hoary speckling, except where black spots, each accompanied by some
brownish ochreous scales, are distinguishable from the less intensely dark wing-surface. Of these spots, the first is on the costa at one-fourth, placed rather obliquely, with a narrow ochreous subcostal line reaching from the base. Another lies nearer to the base on the upper edge of the fold and a third with some ochreous scales preceding and following it, lies in the fold before half of the wing length, and this is almost connected with a discal spot above it. Another triangular black spot, with ochreous scales along its inner edge, is at the end of the cell, beyond which a short, curved, ochreous costal streak precedes
the pale brownish cinereous cilia which are dusted with fuscous. The hindwings are leaden grey, blending to bronzy brownish outward, especially toward the margins.

References

Moths described in 1911
Gelechiini